Space physics, also known as solar-terrestrial physics or space-plasma physics, is the study of plasmas as they occur naturally in the Earth's upper atmosphere (aeronomy) and within the Solar System. As such, it encompasses a far-ranging number of topics, such as heliophysics which includes the solar physics of the Sun, the solar wind, planetary magnetospheres and ionospheres, auroras, cosmic rays, and synchrotron radiation. Space physics is a fundamental part of the study of space weather and has important implications in not only to understanding the universe, but also for practical everyday life, including the operations of communications and weather satellites.

Space physics is distinct from astrophysical plasma and the field of astrophysics, which studies similar plasma phenomena beyond the Solar System. Space physics utilizes in situ measurements from high altitude rockets and spacecraft, in contrast to astrophysical plasma that relies deduction of theory and astronomical observation.

History
Space physics can be traced to the Chinese who discovered the principle of the compass, but did not understand how it worked. During the 16th century, in De Magnete, William Gilbert gave the first description of the Earth's magnetic field, showing that the Earth itself is a great magnet, which explained why a compass needle points north. Deviations of the compass needle magnetic declination were recorded on navigation charts, and a detailed study of the declination near London by watchmaker George Graham resulted in the discovery of irregular magnetic fluctuations that we now call magnetic storms, so named by Alexander Von Humboldt. Gauss and William Weber made very careful measurements of Earth's magnetic field which showed systematic variations and random fluctuations. This suggested that the Earth was not an isolated body, but was influenced by external forces – especially from the Sun and the appearance of sunspots. A relationship between individual aurora and accompanying geomagnetic disturbances was noticed by Anders Celsius and Olof Peter Hiorter in 1747. In 1860, Elias Loomis (1811–1889) showed that the highest incidence of aurora is seen inside an oval of 20 - 25 degrees around the magnetic pole. In 1881, Hermann Fritz published a map of the "isochasms" or lines of constant magnetic field.

In the late 1870s, Henri Becquerel offered the first physical explanation for the statistical correlations that had been recorded: sunspots must be a source of fast protons. They are guided to the poles by the Earth's magnetic field. In the early twentieth century, these ideas led Kristian Birkeland to build a terella, or laboratory device which simulates the Earth's magnetic field in a vacuum chamber, and which uses a cathode ray tube to simulate the energetic particles which compose the solar wind. A theory began to be formulated about the interaction between the Earth's magnetic field and the solar wind.

Space physics did not begin in earnest, however, until the first in situ measurements in the early 1950s, when a team led by Van Allen launched the first rockets to a height around 110 km. Geiger counters on board the second Soviet satellite, Sputnik 2, and the first US satellite, Explorer 1, detected the Earth's radiation belts, later named the Van Allen belts. The boundary between the Earth's magnetic field and interplanetary space was studied by Explorer 10. Future space craft would travel outside Earth orbit and study the composition and structure of the solar wind in much greater detail. These include WIND (spacecraft), (1994), Advanced Composition Explorer (ACE), Ulysses, the Interstellar Boundary Explorer (IBEX) in 2008, and Parker Solar Probe. Other spacecraft would study the sun, such as STEREO and Solar and Heliospheric Observatory (SOHO).

See also
 Effects of spaceflight on the human body
 Space environment
 Space science
 Weightlessness

References

Further reading

External links

 
Plasma physics
Atmospheric sciences

ja:宇宙空間物理学